The Singapore Open Exchange (SOX) is an Internet Exchange Point (IXP) situated in Singapore. It was established on 3 September 2001. SOX is a non-profit, neutral, and independent peering network.

Members
SOX has 29 members:

See also
List of Internet exchange points

External links
 Official website

References

Internet exchange points in Singapore